The Evergreen E class is a series of 5 container ships built for Evergreen Marine. The Ships were built by Mitsubishi Heavy Industries at their Kobe shipyard in Japan. The ships have a maximum theoretical capacity of around 6,332 twenty-foot equivalent units (TEU).

List of ships

References 

Container ship classes